Ceradocus dooliba is a species of amphipod in the subgenus, Denticeradocus, and the family, Maeridae, and was first described in 1972 by Jerry Laurens Barnard. The holotype was collected at Capel Sound in Port Phillip Bay, in the sublittoral zone.

References

External links
Ceradocus dooliba images and occurrence data from GBIF

Gammaridea
Crustaceans described in 1972